Men's Combined World Cup 1984/1985

Final point standings

In Men's Combined World Cup 1984/85 all 5 results count.

Note:

Race 3 not all points were awarded (not enough finishers).

World Cup
FIS Alpine Ski World Cup men's combined discipline titles